David I. Vaughan (born 26 June 1948) is a Welsh professional golfer.

Vaughan played on the European Tour where his best finishes were a pair of third places: 1972 Benson & Hedges Festival of Golf and 1977 Martini International. He represented Wales seven times in the World Cup. He was the professional at Vale of Llangollen Golf Club where he stayed until his retirement in 2013 after 32 years service.

Vaughan also played on the European Seniors Tour.

Tournament wins
1971 Lord Derby’s Under-23 Professional Tournament
1980 Midland Professional Championship

Results in major championships

Note: Vaughan only played in The Open Championship.

CUT = missed the half-way cut
"T" indicates a tie for a place

Team appearances
World Cup (representing Wales): 1972, 1973, 1977, 1978, 1979, 1980, 1983
Double Diamond International (representing Wales): 1971, 1972, 1973, 1974, 1975, 1976, 1977
Marlboro Nations' Cup (representing Wales): 1972, 1973

References

External links

Welsh male golfers
European Tour golfers
European Senior Tour golfers
1948 births
Living people